Mullion School is a coeducational secondary school located in Mullion, which is on the Lizard Peninsula in Cornwall, England. The year groups are seven to eleven. Mullion school was declared closed by The Prince of Wales on 20 May 1980. The school's logo is the arctic tern, which has a migration pattern of 5 years as it goes from the North Pole to the South Pole - the same amount of time as it takes to go through secondary school. Arctic terns also disperse all over the world, like all the students do.

Previously a foundation school and Performing Arts College administered by Cornwall Council, in June 2017 Mullion School converted to academy status. The school is now sponsored by Southerly Point Multi-Academy Trust.

Achievements
A 2011 Ofsted report noted 'The school has attained a number of awards including the silver Artsmark, Investors in People (Silver Award), Healthy School and Dyslexia Friendly School awards'  and found it to be an 'outstanding school', the highest grading.

References

External links

Secondary schools in Cornwall
Academies in Cornwall
Mullion, Cornwall